The Capri 22 is an American trailerable sailboat, that was designed by Gary Mull and Frank Butler and first built in 1984.

Production
The boat was first built by Catalina Yachts of Hollywood, California in 1984 and remains in production.

Design

The Capri 22 is a small recreational keelboat, built predominantly of fiberglass, with wood trim. It has a fractional sloop rig, a transom hung rudder and a conventional fin keel, shoal-draft keel or winged keel.

The design has sleeping accommodation for four people, with a double "V"-berth in the bow cabin and two straight settees in the main cabin. An ice box is located under the companionway ladder. The head is a portable type, located under the bow cabin berth.

Variants
Capri 22
The shoal-draft version has a modified rudder.
Capri 22 WK
Capri 22 TR
Version with a tall rig,  taller than the conventional version.

Operational history
In a 2010 review Steve Henkel wrote, "the Capri 22 was designed to be a light, fast family boat with an emphasis on daysailing and fleet local racing. One main parameter in conceiving the Capri line was to produce a very well-finished boat for a reasonable price. One result is that both hull and deck have neat and easy-to-clean fiberglass liners. Another result is that when the boat first came off the line in 1985, the base price was a mere $6,000 ... Best features: Her PHRF of 201 puts her in the "fast" category ... Active fleets in most parts of the United States can make life more fun and interesting for owners who seek camaraderie. Worst features: Accommodations are very basic, and headroom is low ...."

See also
List of sailing boat types

Similar sailboats
Alberg 22
Buccaneer 220
C&C SR 21
Cape Dory 22
CS 22
DS-22
Edel 665
Falmouth Cutter 22
Hunter 22
J/22
Marlow-Hunter 22
Marshall 22
Nonsuch 22
Pearson Electra
Pearson Ensign
Ranger 22
Seaward 22
Spindrift 22
Starwind 223
Tanzer 22
Triton 22
US Yachts US 22

References

External links

Keelboats
1980s sailboat type designs
Sailing yachts
Trailer sailers
Sailboat type designs by Gary Mull
Sailboat type designs by Frank Butler
Sailboat types built by Catalina Yachts